Barani-ye Kord (also Romanized as Bārānī-ye Kord) is a village in Hasanlu Rural District, Mohammadyar District, Naqadeh County, West Azerbaijan Province, Iran. At the 2006 census, its population was 364, in 61 families.

References 

Populated places in Naqadeh County